Princess Ubol Ratana (born 5 April 1951) is a member of the Thai royal family. She is the eldest child of King Bhumibol Adulyadej and Queen Sirikit and elder sister of King Vajiralongkorn.

In 1972, she married American citizen Peter Ladd Jensen and settled in the United States, losing her royal title in the process. The couple divorced in 1998, whereupon she resumed her royal duties and position within the Thai court. She is styled in English as Princess Ubol Ratana, without the style Her Royal Highness.

In 2001, she permanently returned to Thailand after a series of visits in the years following her divorce. Almost immediately, she began to fulfill her royal duties by taking part in many ceremonies. She started many charitable foundations that focused on improving the quality of life for the disadvantaged.

In February 2019, in an "unprecedented" move, Ubol Ratana announced her candidacy for Prime Minister of Thailand in the 2019 general election, running as a candidate of the Thai Raksa Chart Party. Later that same day, her younger brother King Vajiralongkorn issued a statement, stating that her candidacy is "inappropriate" and "unconstitutional". Thailand’s election commission then disqualified her from running for prime minister, formally putting an end to her candidacy.

Early life
Princess Ubol Ratana Rajakanya is the eldest child of King Bhumibol Adulyadej and Queen Sirikit. She was born on 5 April 1951, at Clinique de Montchoisi in Lausanne, Switzerland. She is the only child born outside of Thailand from the four children of former King Bhumibol and Queen Sirikit.

Ubol Ratana, part of her royal name, means "glass lotus", a reference to her maternal grandmother, Bua ("lotus") Kitiyakara. Her parents nicknamed her "Pay", short for poupee (French for "doll"). To her family she is known as Phi Ying. In the media and by Thai people in general, she is called Thun Kramom, a title identifying the daughter of a reigning queen.

She returned to Thailand and stayed at Amphorn Sathan Residential Hall, Dusit Palace. She was styled "Her Royal Highness" by her father at the royal celebration of the first month birthday ceremony (Phra Ratchaphithi Somphot Duean Lae Khuen Phra U; พระราชพิธีสมโภชเดือนและขึ้นพระอู่) King Bhumibol Adulyadej gave her full name and title "Her Royal Highness Princess Ubol Ratana Rajakanya Sirivadhana Barnavadi".

Ubol Ratana was Bhumibol's favorite child because she was attractive and excelled at academics and sports, where her brother, Vajiralongkorn did not. The king greatly enjoyed playing tennis and badminton with her. This was partly due to his suspicion that others were not trying their hardest when playing sports with him and he admired Ubol Ratana for always trying her best.

In the 1967 Southeast Asian Peninsular Games (today called the "Southeast Asian Games") held in Bangkok, the king and the princess competed in the OK Dinghy sailing class and won gold medals for Thailand.

Their participation was conceived by Air Chief Marshal Dawee Chullasapya who wanted Bhumibol to be seen excelling in sports, much like a Norwegian king who won a gold Olympics medal. During the race, Ubol Ratana was ahead and the king was trailing behind. Davee feared that this would tarnish the king's prestige, but ultimately the king won the race and the father and daughter shared the medal.

Education
Ubol Ratana attended primary to secondary levels at Chitralada School. She went to the United States for her tertiary education. She studied at Massachusetts Institute of Technology, graduating with a Bachelor of Science in mathematics in 1973. She later obtained a master's degree in public health at University of California, Los Angeles.

Marriage and family
While studying at university, Ubol Ratana dated an American, Peter Ladd Jensen. The palace discovered this, and her parents strongly opposed their relationship. The princess refused to conform to their wishes; on 25 July 1972, she married Jensen.

According to Paul M. Handley's biography of Bhumibol, the king became furious at Ubol Ratana and stripped her of her royal title. Ubol Ratana made many attempts to ask her father to reinstate her royal title before and after her permanent return to Thailand, but the king never relented.

The princess lived in the United States with her husband for over 26 years and took the name "Mrs. Julie Jensen". After years of rumoured marital problems, they divorced in 1998. Ubol Ratana and her children continued to reside in San Diego until 2001, when they returned to Thailand.

The couple had three children, two daughters and a son, all born in the United States:

 Than Phu Ying Ploypailin Mahidol Jensen (born 12 February 1981) married David Wheeler on 25 August 2009, and has three children.
 Khun Bhumi Jensen (affectionately known as Khun Poom) (16 August 1983 – 26 December 2004), who had autism, died in the 2004 Indian Ocean earthquake and tsunami. Princess Ubol Ratana established the Khun Poom Foundation in his memory, to aid children with autism and other learning disabilities.
Than Phu Ying Sirikitiya Mai Jensen (born 18 March 1985) holds a degree in history.

While Ubol Ratana remained in the US, her mother (Queen Sirikit) and other members of the royal family often flew there for visits. Ubol Ratana likewise flew to Thailand along with her husband to visit her parents and the other members of the royal family, while joining them in royal ceremonies when she visited Thailand. She visited in 1980, 1982, 1987, 1992 and 1996, taking part in several family events, before her permanent return in 2001.

Charitable work
Ubol Ratana launched the "To Be Number One" Foundation in 2002 to combat drug use by young people.  the foundation has more than 31 million members throughout Thailand. She hosts the television show, "Talk to the Princess" on TVT11 NBT where she promotes the aims of her anti-drug work.

Film career
In 2003, Ubol Ratana starred in a Thai soap opera, Kasattiya. In 2006 she had a role in Anantalai, a drama series she wrote under the pen name "Ploykampetch". In 2011, the princess and her daughter Ploypailin Jensen starred in Dao Long Fah, Pupha Si-ngen.

Ubol Ratana acted in the Thai movie Where The Miracle Happens (Neung Jai Diaokan) (หนึ่งใจ..เดียวกัน), released on 7 August 2008 (in this film she also participated as a screenwriter). She plays a "lonely-at-the-top" CEO who begins a life of philanthropy after the death of her only daughter.
In 2010, she appeared in the action film My Best Bodyguard (มายเบสท์บอดี้การ์ด), released on 21 October 2010. In 2012, she appeared in the romantic film Together (Wan Tee Rak) (ร่วมกัน), released on 20 December 2012.

Political career
In 2019, it was announced Ubol Ratana would run as the prime ministerial candidate for the Thaksin-affiliated Thai Raksa Chart Party in the 2019 general election, called an "astonishing" move without precedent, as the royal family has never been directly involved in electoral politics. Her candidacy was quickly quashed by her brother, King Rama X, on the grounds that members of the royal family may not overtly participate in politics. After his statement, the Thai Raksa Chart Party withdrew their support for her run. The Election Commission, citing the king's statement, disqualified her.

Ancestry

Notes

References

External links
 
Movie: หนึ่งใจ..เดียวกัน (Where The Miracle Happens)
Movie review (en)

1951 births
Living people
20th-century Thai women
20th-century Chakri dynasty
Mahidol family
Thai princesses
21st-century Thai women politicians
21st-century Thai politicians
21st-century Chakri dynasty
Thai people of Mon descent
UCLA School of Public Health alumni
Knights Grand Cordon of the Order of Chula Chom Klao
People from Lausanne
Thai film actresses
21st-century Thai actresses
Thai female Chao Fa
Children of Bhumibol Adulyadej
MIT School of Humanities, Arts, and Social Sciences alumni
Daughters of kings